The Organization of the Black Sea Economic Cooperation (BSEC) is a regional international organization focusing on multilateral political and economic initiatives aimed at fostering cooperation, peace, stability and prosperity in the Black Sea region. It traces its origin to 25 June 1992, when Turkish President Turgut Özal and leaders of ten other countries gathered in Istanbul and signed the Summit Declaration and the "Bosphorus Statement". BSEC Headquarters – the Permanent International Secretariat of the Organization of the Black Sea Economic Cooperation (BSEC PERMIS) – was established in March 1994, also in Istanbul.

With the entry into force of its Charter on 1 May 1999, BSEC acquired international legal identity and was transformed into a full-fledged regional economic organization: Organization of the Black Sea Economic Cooperation. With the accession of Serbia (then Serbia and Montenegro) in April 2004, the Organization’s Member States increased to twelve. North Macedonia's accession in 2020 increased the organization's membership to thirteen.

An important aspect of the activities of BSEC is the development of SME and entrepreneurship in the member countries. Concerning these issues, a series of workshops have been organized in cooperation with Konrad Adenauer Foundation and ERENET.

Membership 

Founding members:

Later members:

As seen above, membership has not been restricted to countries which have access to the Black Sea: Albania, Armenia, Azerbaijan, Greece, North Macedonia, Moldova, and Serbia do not have coastlines on the Black Sea, though the last two are connected through the Danube river corridor and Greece through the two sea straits.

North Macedonia's application was vetoed by Greece after Turkey vetoed the previous application of the Republic of Cyprus, prompting Greece to cease to approve future applications from any country. However, North Macedonia was admitted into the bloc on 9 November 2020.

Observer nations:
 
 
 
 
 
 
 
 
 
 
 
 
 
 

Observer organizations:
 International Black Sea Club
 Energy Charter Secretariat
 European Commission
 Black Sea Commission

Sectoral Dialogue Partner Countries:
 
 
 
 
 

Sectoral Dialogue Partner organizations:
 Black and Azov Seas Ports Association (BASPA)
 Black Sea International Shipowners Association (BINSA)
 Black Sea Region Association of Shipbuilders and Shiprepairers (BRASS)
 Black Sea Universities Network (BSUN)
 Union of Road Transport Association in the Black Sea Economic Cooperation Region (BSEC-URTA)
 Conference of Peripheral Maritime Regions for Europe (CPMR)
 Danube Commission
 International Network for SMEs (INSME)
 World Tourism Organization

International organizations:
 Eurasian Economic Union
 International Commission of TRACECA
 Interparliamentary Assembly on Orthodoxy
 Parliamentary Assembly of the Mediterranean
 The Central European Initiative
 United Nations
 United Nations Development Programme
 United Nations Economic Commission for Europe
 United Nations Industrial Development Organization
 World Bank
 World Trade Organization

Structure 

 Summit Meetings of the Heads of State or Government of the Member States meets regularly every 5 years;
 Council of Ministers of Foreign Affairs is the main decision-making organ of BSEC, and meets twice a year;
 The Council of Ministers meets to achieve consensus on specific issues;
 The Committee of Senior Officials meets 4 times a year and acts on behalf of Ministers of Foreign Affairs;
 The Subsidiary Organs formed by the Council of Ministers of Foreign Affairs deal with their mandate defined by the Council, prepare joint projects and follow the implementation of these projects. Working Groups and Groups of Experts are the Subsidiary Organs;
 Chairmanship-in-Office coordinates all activities of BSEC, as well as, it controls the proper conduct of the activities of the organization and implementation of the Resolutions and Decisions adopted by the Council. In English alphabetical order, one of the Member States heads  the Chairmanship-in-Office every 6 months. Chairmanship in BSEC is performed by Ukraine for the term of 1 July - 31 December 2017.

Related bodies 
Related bodies of BSEC carry out their functions due respect to the principles of BSEC defined in the Summit Declaration of 25 June 1992 and in the Charter. They have their own budget.

Parliamentary Assembly of the Black Sea Economic Cooperation (PABSEC) 
The Parliamentary Assembly of the Black Sea Economic Cooperation based in Istanbul, is the inter-parliamentary consultative institution of the organization formed based on the Declaration on the Establishment of the Parliamentary Assembly of the Black Sea Economic Cooperation on February 26, 1993 by 9 founding states. Greece joined PABSEC in 1995, Bulgaria joined in 1997, and Serbia (former Serbia and Montenegro) joined in 2004.

Representatives of Parliaments of member countries pursue objectives which are stated in the preamble of the PABSEC Rules and Procedures: insure the understanding and adoption of the ideas and objectives of BSEC; provide a legal basis for social, economic, cultural, commercial and political cooperation among the member states; provide support to the national parliaments to reinforce the parliamentary democracy; pass the legislation required for the implementation of the decisions adopted by the Heads of States or by the Ministers of Foreign Affairs.

Main bodies of PABSEC are General Assembly, Standing Committee, the Bureau, Committees, the President, the Secretary General, and the International Secretariat.The Assembly is composed of 76 members. English, French, Russian and Turkish are the working languages of PABSEC.

The President of PABSEC is Archil Talakvadze from Georgia, the Vice-President is Anush Beghloyan from Armenia.

Russia was expelled in December 2022.

Black Sea Economic Cooperation Organization Business Council (BSEC BC) 
The Black Sea Economic Cooperation Organization Business Council was formed in 1992 as an international, non-governmental and non-profit organization to strengthen the improvement of the business environment within Black Sea region. Business Council represents the business communities of member states. The International Secretariat of Business Council is based in Istanbul.

Black Sea Trade and Development Bank (BSTDB) 

The Black Sea Trade and Development Bank (BSTDB) is an international financial institution that was formed 24 January 1997. It supports economic development and regional cooperation by providing trade and project financing, guarantees, and equity for development projects supporting both public and private enterprises in its member countries. Objectives of the bank include promoting regional trade links, cross country projects, foreign direct investment, supporting activities that contribute to sustainable development, with an emphasis on the generation of employment in the member countries, ensuring that each operation is economically and financially sound and contributes to the development of a market orientation. The organization has an authorized capital of $1.325 billion. The bank's headquarters are located in Thessaloniki, Greece.

BSTDB is governed by the Agreement Establishing Black Sea Trade and Development Bank, a United Nations registered treaty. Unlike the International Monetary Fund and others, the BSTDB does not attach policy conditions by which debtor states can be controlled. The Bank has a long term credit rating of 'A' from Moody's Investors Service and an 'A3' from Standard & Poor's, both with a stable outlook.

International Centre for Black Sea Studies (ICBSS) 

The International Center for Black Sea Studies is an independent think tank focused on the wider Black Sea region, which serves as a related body of BSEC at the same time. It was established in 1998.

BSEC Coordination Center for the Exchange of Statistical Data and Economic Information (BCCESDEI) 
The BSEC Coordination Center for the Exchange of Statistical Data and Economic Information was established with the aim to collect statistical and economic information, accomplish secretarial functions, coordinate obtained data and share it with member countries.

Working Groups 
Member states are cooperating on different issues within the Working Groups. They are the following:

The functions of Working Groups, of which country coordinators have not been appointed yet, are performed temporarily by the PERMIS.

See also

 Black Sea Forum for Partnership and Dialogue
 Black Sea Trade and Development Bank (BSTDB)
 Black Sea trade and economy
 Central European Free Trade Agreement (CEFTA)
 Central European Initiative (CEI)
 EU Med Group
 International Centre for Black Sea Studies (ICBSS)
 Southeast European Cooperation Process (SEECP)
 Southeast European Cooperative Initiative (SECI)
 Southeast Europe Transport Community
 Stability Pact for Southeastern Europe (SP for SEE)

Notes

References

External links
 BSEC website

Organizations established in 1992
International economic organizations
United Nations General Assembly observers
Black Sea Region
Black Sea organizations
International organizations based in Turkey
European integration
Organizations based in Istanbul